Gas Huffin' Bad Gals! is a 2000 film written by and starring Bradford Scobie. It was accepted into the Cannes Film Festival, the New York Underground Film Festival, the Outfest festival in Los Angeles, and was broadcast in England by BBC television.  It was not shown in the rest of the United Kingdom.

References

External links

2000 films
2000 short films
American black-and-white films
2000s English-language films